Sedgwick Castle was a castle in Sedgwick, West Sussex, England. S. E. Winbolt led excavations at the castle in 1923 and 1924.

References

Citations

Further reading 

 

Castles in West Sussex
Ruins in West Sussex
Scheduled monuments in West Sussex